Jasmine Dickey (born February 23, 2000) is an American professional basketball player for the Dallas Wings in the Women's National Basketball Association (WNBA). She played college basketball at Delaware. She was drafted in the Third Round of the 2022 WNBA Draft by the Dallas Wings.

High school
Dickey helped lead Catonsville High School to the school's first ever state championship in 2017 for Class 4A, as well as a runner-up finish in 2018. She scored a game-high 30 points in the 2017 championship game. Dickey was also a 2-time Maryland Basketball Coaches Association Ms. Basketball.

College career
Dickey committed to the Delaware Blue Hens in September 2017.

Dickey began her first two-season averaging 7.9 and 12.6 points in her freshman and sophomore season, respectively. She was named to the All-Rookie team during her freshman campaign, as well. Her increase in production also earned her a spot on the All-CAA Second Team in her sophomore year.

During her sophomore year, Dickey scored her 1,000th career point against James Madison. She was also the second-leading scorer in the conference, as well as the 12th overall in the entire NCAA with an average of 22.6 points. For the year, Dickey averaged 22.6 points, 9.1 rebounds, and 1.9 assists, which earned her the CAA Player of the Year award.

Dickey didn't stop scoring in her senior year. She averaged 25.3 points and 10.2 rebounds this time - which earned her a 2nd CAA Player of the Year. She was the first Delaware player to earn back to back Player of the Year awards since Elena Delle Donne did it in 2012 and 2013. Dickey was also named a finalist for the Becky Hammon Mid-Major Player of the Year Award. Dickey and the Blue Hens reached the NCAA Tournament in her senior year. She scored 31 points against Maryland, but the Blue Hens ultimately ended up losing, and Dickey's Delaware career was over.

College statistics

Professional career

Dallas Wings
Dickey was selected in the Third Round of the 2022 WNBA Draft by the Dallas Wings. She was selected with the 30th pick overall. She was the third player ever chosen in the WNBA Draft from Delaware - joining Tyresa Smith and Elena Delle Donne.

WNBA career statistics

Regular season

|-
| align="left" | 2022
| align="left" | Dallas
| 20 || 0 || 4.7 || .212 || .250 || .667 || 0.6 || 0.1 || 0.2 || 0.1 || 0.3 || 1.1
|-
| align="left" | Career
| align="left" | 1 year, 1 team
| 20 || 0 || 4.7 || .212 || .250 || .667 || 0.6 || 0.1 || 0.2 || 0.1 || 0.3 || 1.1

Playoffs

|-
| align="left" | 2022
| align="left" | Dallas
| 1 || 0 || 2.0 || .000 || .000 || .000 || 0.0 || 0.0 || 0.0 || 0.0 || 0.0 || 0.0
|-
| align="left" | Career
| align="left" | 1 year, 1 team
| 1 || 0 || 2.0 || .000 || .000 || .000 || 0.0 || 0.0 || 0.0 || 0.0 || 0.0 || 0.0

References

External links
WNBA bio
Delaware Blue Hens bio

2000 births
Living people
American women's basketball players
Basketball players from Maryland
Guards (basketball)
Forwards (basketball)
Delaware Fightin' Blue Hens women's basketball players
Dallas Wings draft picks
Dallas Wings players
People from Catonsville, Maryland